The 1994 Buffalo Bills season was the 35th season for the team franchise and the 25th in the National Football League. The Bills entered the season as the four-time defending AFC champions and looked to advance to the playoff for the seventh consecutive season and to the Super Bowl for the fifth consecutive season.

However, for the first time since 1987, the Bills failed to make the playoff. Buffalo finished at 7–9 for the year, only good enough for fourth place in the AFC East. Going into Week 14 the Bills were still in post season contention, before losing their final three games and finishing the season with a losing record for the first time since the strike-shortened 1987 season.

NFL draft

Personnel

Staff/coaches

Roster

Regular season

Schedule

Game summaries

Week 1 

Pete Carroll's debut as a head coach with the New York Jets.

Week 2

Week 3 

In a game that featured the old American Football League helmets, the Houston Oilers starting QB for this game was Bucky Richardson.

Week 4

Week 5

Week 6

Week 7

Week 9

Week 10

Week 11

Week 12

Week 13

Week 14

Week 15

Week 16

Week 17

Standings

Awards and records

References 

 Bills on Pro Football Reference
 Bills on jt-sw.com
 Bills Stats on jt-sw.com

Buffalo Bills
Buffalo Bills seasons
Buff